Alberoni may refer to

 , human settlement in Lido di Venezia, Italy
 Alberoni (surname), Italian surname
 Collegio Alberoni, Roman Catholic seminary located in Piacenza, Italy
 , island in the Venetian Lagoon, Italy

See also
 Albergoni (disambiguation)